Aschistanthera is a genus of flowering plants belonging to the family Melastomataceae.

Its native range is Vietnam.

Species:

Aschistanthera cristanthera

References

Melastomataceae
Melastomataceae genera